Böyük Həmyə (also, Arab Gam’ya and Bëyuk Gam’ya) is a village and municipality in the Siazan Rayon of Azerbaijan.  It has a population of 1,752.

References 

Populated places in Siyazan District